Ralph Robinson may refer to:

 Ralph Robinson (humanist) of the sixteenth century
 Ralph Robinson (clergyman) of the seventeenth century
 George III of the United Kingdom (1738-1820) wrote agricultural papers under this name.